The Boleto De Entrada Tour was a concert tour by Puerto Rican singer-songwriter Kany García in support of her second studio album of the same name, presented by the "Oficina de la Procuradora de las Mujeres de Puerto Rico". García expected to start touring this album in the summer of 2010. The tour started in Puerto Rico and continued in Latin America and the United States. García said via her official Twitter page that she would be on a promotional tour in Mexico from 5 to 11 July 2010, promoting what would be her concert tour in late 2010. In early 2011, she also toured other Latin American countries.

Set list

Puerto Rico
"Dime la Verdad"
"Esta Soledad"
"Adónde vas""
"Eres Tú"
"Para Volver a Amar"
"Todo Basta"
"Estigma De Amor"
"12 de Noviembre"
"Feliz"
"Cuando Tú No Estás"
"Te Vuelvo a Ver"
"¿Qué Nos Pasó?"
"Hoy"
"Hasta Dónde"
"Esta Vida Tuya Y Mía"
"¿Adónde fue Cecilia?"
"Si Tú Me Lo Pides" featuring Pedro Capó
"Si Ya No Estas Conmigo"
"Amigo en el Baño"
"Mi Dueña" featuring Victoria Sanabria
"Hoy Ya Me Voy"

Tour dates

Personnel
Tour Sponsors
MGD Light - Puerto Rico
Ford Motor Company - Puerto Rico
Univision - Puerto Rico
Dove - Puerto Rico
Fidelity - Puerto Rico
COPEP - Puerto Rico
El Nuevo Día - Puerto Rico

References

2010 concert tours